"Let's Do This" a song recorded by American recording artist Miley Cyrus from the Hannah Montana: The Movie soundtrack. It was also included on Hannah Montana 3.

Background
On "Let's Do This", a party dance track, Cyrus sings about owing her fans a good performance with lines such as: "You came a long way to be with us / You paid good money to see a show / So let's get ready 'cause here we go". The song was originally written and recorded by singer Adam Tefteller.

Promotion
The song supports the third season of Hannah Montana. "Let's Do This" was featured four times during the third season in the episodes: "Papa's Got a New Friend", "Jake... Another Little Piece of My Heart", "Miley Hurt the Feelings of the Radio Star" and "He Could Be the One". It was also used as background music in Hannah Montana: Sing Whaaat?, various commercials for Hannah Montana: The Movie and in the ending credits for the film.

Music video
A music video for the song premiered on Disney Channel on December 13, 2008. The video features footage of Miley Cyrus (as Montana) performing the song during a live filmed concert.
 The performance included dance routines, lifting, and fireworks. The video, along with seven others are available in the iTunes deluxe edition and the physical CD of Hannah Montana 3.

Formats and track listings

Chart performance
The song debuted and peaked at number 23 on the Bubbling Under Hot 100 Chart (Hot 100 - 123) and falling off the next week; being Hannah Montana's lowest chart entry, then was beat by "It's All Right Here". And in Canada the track charted on Hot Canadian Digital Singles at no. 69, but failed to chart on the Canadian Hot 100.

Charts

Release history

Credits and personnel
Vocals – Miley Cyrus as Hannah Montana
Producer – Ali Dee Theodore, Jason Gleed and Alana da Fonseca
Writer (s) – Derek George, Tim Owens, Adam Tefteller and Ali Theodore
Mixer and additional programming – Brian Malouf

References

Hannah Montana songs
Songs from television series
Songs written by Tim Owens
Songs written by Derek George
2008 songs